The 2022–23 BYU Cougars women's basketball team represents Brigham Young University during the 2022–23 NCAA Division I women's basketball season. It is head coach Amber Whiting's first season at BYU after Jeff Judkins retired at the end of the previous season. The Cougars, playing as members of the West Coast Conference for the final season, play their home games at the Marriott Center.

Before the season

Departures
After a season in which most players returned due to COVID-19 regulations, BYU finds themselves having lost quite a few seniors and last seasons leading scorer.

Newcomers

2022–23 media

BYU Sports Media

All Cougars home games will being shown on BYUtv or the BYUtv App. Conference road games will shown on WCC Network and Stadium College Sports. Most remaining non-conference road games will also being streamed. Streaming partners for those games can be found on the schedule.

Roster

Schedule

|-
!colspan=8 style=| Exhibition

|-
!colspan=8 style=| Non-conference regular season

|-
!colspan=8 style=| WCC regular season

|-
!colspan=8 style=| WCC Tournament

|-
!colspan=8 style=| WNIT

Game Summaries

Exhibition: Westminster
Broadcasters: Jason Shepherd and Kristen Kozlowski  
Starting Lineups:
Westminster: Rae Falatea, Margarita Satini, Lyndzi Rich, Ashley Greenwood, Elizabeth Means
BYU: Gabriela Bosquez, Amanda Barcello, Nani Falatea, Lauren Gustin, Emma Calvert

Colorado State
Broadcasters: Adam Nigon 
Series History: BYU leads series 55–24
Starting Lineups:
BYU: Amanda Barcello, Nani Falatea, Arielle Mackey-Williams, Lauren Gustin, Emma Calvert
Colorado State: Destin Thurman, McKenna Hofschild, Cali Clark, Sydney Mech, Meghan Boyd

Montana State
Broadcasters: Spencer Linton, Kristen Kozlowski, and Jason Shepherd 
Series History: BYU leads series 9–3 
Starting Lineups:
Montana State: Darian White, Kola Bad Bear, Kately Limardo, Leia Beattie, Taylor Janssen
BYU: Amanda Barcello, Nani Falatea, Arielle Mackey-Williams, Lauren Gustin, Emma Calvert

Oklahoma
Broadcasters:  Spencer Linton and Kristen Kozlowski 
Series History: Oklahoma leads series 6–1 
Starting Lineups:
Oklahoma: Nevaeh Tot, Ana Llanusa, Madi Williams, Taylor Robertson, Liz Scott
BYU: Amanda Barcello, Nani Falatea, Kaylee Smiler, Lauren Gustin, Rose Bubakar

Washington State
Broadcasters:  No commentary 
Series History: Series even 6–6 
Starting Lineups:
BYU: Amanda Barcello, Nani Falatea, Kaylee Smiler, Lauren Gustin, Rose Bubakar
Washington State: Tara Wallack, Charlisse Leger-Walker, Ula Motuga, Johanna Teder, Bella Murekatete

Troy
Broadcasters:  No commentary 
Series History: First Meeting 
Starting Lineups:
Troy: Makayia Hallmon, Jada Walton, Tai'Sheka Porchia, Ja'Mia Hollings, Sharonica Hartsfield
BYU: Amanda Barcello, Nani Falatea, Kaylee Smiler, Lauren Gustin, Rose Bubakar

Carroll College
Broadcasters:  Spencer Linton and Kristen Kozlowski 
Series History: First Meeting 
Starting Lineups:
Carroll College: Kyndall Keller, Kamden Hillborn, Sienna Swannack, Jamie Pickens, Maddie Geritz
BYU: Amanda Barcello, Nani Falatea, Kaylee Smiler, Lauren Gustin, Rose Bubakar

Ball State
Broadcasters:  Dave McCann and Kristen Kozlowski 
Series History: First Meeting 
Starting Lineups:
Ball State: Ally Becki, Thelma Dis Agustsdottir, Marie Kiefer, Madelyn Bischoff, Anna Celphane
BYU: Amanda Barcello, Nani Falatea, Kaylee Smiler, Lauren Gustin, Rose Bubakar

Boise State
Broadcasters: Chris Lewis and Bailey Hawkins 
Series History: BYU leads series 12-8 
Starting Lineups:
BYU: Nani Falatea, Kaylee Smiler, Lauren Gustin, Rose Bubakar, Emma Calvert
Boise State: Mya Hansen, Dani Byes, Mary Kay Naro, Elodie Lalotte, Abby Muse

Utah State
Broadcasters:  Ajay Salvesen and Jake Ellis 
Series History: BYU leads series 39–4 
Starting Lineups:
BYU: Nani Falatea, Arielle Mackey-Williams, Lauren Gustin, Rose Bubakar, Emma Calvert
Utah State: Tamiah Robinson, Maria Carvalho, Olivia Wikstrom, Mayson Kimball, Ashya Klopfenstein

Utah
Broadcasters:  Spencer Linton, Kristen Kozlowski, and Jason Shepherd 
Series History: Utah leads series 67-42 
Starting Lineups:
Utah: Ines Vieira, Gianna Kneepkens, Jenna Johnson, Kennady McQueen, Alissa Pili
BYU: Nani Falatea, Kaylee Smiler, Lauren Gustin, Rose Bubakar, Emma Calvert

Gonzaga
Broadcasters: Greg Heister and Stephanie Hawk-Freeman 
Series History: Gonzaga leads series 19–16 
Starting Lineups:
BYU: Nani Falatea, Kaylee Smiler, Lauren Gustin, Rose Bubakar, Emma Calvert 
Gonzaga: Eliza Hollingsworth, Kaylynne Truong, Yvonne Ejim, Brynna Maxwell, McKayla Williams

Portland
Broadcasters:  Ann Schatz and Jennifer Mountain
Series History: BYU leads series 27–6 
Starting Lineups:
BYU: Nani Falatea, Kaylee Smiler, Lauren Gustin, Rose Bubakar, Emma Calvert 
Portland: Emme Shearer, Haylee Andrews, Alex Fowler, Liana Kaitu'u, Maisie Burnham

Monmouth
Broadcasters: Spencer Linton, Kristen Kozlowski, and Jason Shepherd 
Series History: First Meeting 
Starting Lineups:
Monmouth: Ariana Vanderhoop, Kaci Donovan, Brianna Tinsley, Elizabeth Marsicano, Belle Kranbuhl
BYU: Nani Falatea, Kaylee Smiler, Lauren Gustin, Rose Bubakar, Emma Calvert

Pacific
Broadcasters: Spencer Linton and Kristen Kozlowski 
Series History: BYU leads series 19–4 
Starting Lineups:
Pacific: Anaya James, Cecilia Holmberg, Elizabeth Elliott, Erica Adams, Sam Ashby
BYU: Nani Falatea, Arielle Mackey-Williams, Kaylee Smiler, Lauren Gustin, Emma Calvert

Saint Mary's
Broadcasters: Spencer Linton, Kristen Kozlowski, and Jason Shepherd 
Series History: BYU leads series 15-10 
Starting Lineups:
Saint Mary's: Taycee Wedin, Tayla Dalton, Hannah Rapp, Aspen Garrison, Ali Bamberger
BYU: Nani Falatea, Arielle Mackey-Williams, Kaylee Smiler, Lauren Gustin, Emma Calvert

San Diego
Broadcasters: Spencer Linton, Kristen Kozlowski, & Jason Shepherd 
Series History: BYU leads series 15–8 
Starting Lineups:
San Diego: Kiera Oakry, Ayanna Khalfani, Kasey Neubert, Kylie Horstmeyer, Amanda Olinger
BYU: Nani Falatea, Arielle Mackey-Williams, Kaylee Smiler, Lauren Gustin, Emma Calvert

Loyola Marymount
Broadcasters: Brendan Craig & Gary Craig 
Series History: BYU leads series 21-2 
Starting Lineups:
BYU: Nani Flatea, Arielle Mackey-Williams, Kaylee Smiler, Lauren Gustin, Emma Calvert
Loyola Marymount: Nicole Rodriguez, Cassandra Gordon, Ariel Johnson, Khari Clark, Alexis Mark

Pepperdine
Broadcasters: Darren Preston 
Series History: BYU leads series 24–4 
Starting Lineups:
BYU: Nani Falatea, Arielle Mackey-Williams, Kaylee Smiler, Lauren Gustin, Emma Calvert
Pepperdine: Jane Nwaba, Helena Friend, Marly Walls, Meaali'i Amosa, Becky Obinma

San Francisco
Broadcasters: Spencer Linton, Kristen Kozlowski, & Jason Shepherd 
Series History: BYU leads series 24-7 
Starting Lineups:
San Francisco: Kia Vaalavirta, Jessica McDowell-White, Kennedy Dickie, Ioanna Krimili, Abby Rathbun
BYU: Nani Falatea, Arielle Mackey-Williams, Kaylee Smiler, Lauren Gustin, Emma Calvert

Santa Clara
Broadcasters:  Jason Shepherd & Kristen Kozlowski 
Series History: BYU leads series 23–2 
Starting Lineups:
Santa Clara: Ashlee Maldonado, Lara Edmanson, Marya Hudgins, Ashley Hiraki, Tess Heal
BYU: Nani Falatea, Arielle Mackey-Williams, Kaylee Smiler, Lauren Gustin, Emma Calvert

Saint Mary's
Broadcasters: Evan Giddings & Joaquin Wallace 
Series History: BYU leads series 16–10 
Starting Lineups:
BYU: 
Saint Mary's:

Pacific
Broadcasters:  
Series History: BYU leads series 20–4 
Starting Lineups:
Pacific: 
BYU:

San Diego
Broadcasters:  
Series History: BYU leads series 
Starting Lineups:
BYU: 
San Diego:

Pepperdine
Broadcasters:  
Series History: BYU leads series 
Starting Lineups:
Pepperdine: 
BYU:

Loyola Marymount
Broadcasters: 
Series History: BYU leads series 
Starting Lineups:
Loyola Marymount: 
BYU:

Santa Clara
Broadcasters:  
Series History: BYU leads series 
Starting Lineups:
BYU: 
Santa Clara:

San Francisco
Broadcasters: 
Series History: BYU leads series  
Starting Lineups:
BYU: 
San Francisco:

Portland
Broadcasters:  
Series History: BYU leads series 27–7 
Starting Lineups:
Portland:
BYU:

Gonzaga
Broadcasters: 
Series History: Gonzaga leads series 20–16 
Starting Lineups:
Gonzaga: 
BYU:

Conference Honors
Conference honors will be filled in once they announce preseason and postseason information,

Rankings
2022–23 NCAA Division I women's basketball rankings

^The Coaches poll did not release a week 1 ranking.

References

BYU Cougars women's basketball seasons
BYU
BYU Cougars
BYU Cougars
BYU